Republic of 2PM is the first Japanese studio album (third album overall) by South Korean boy band 2PM. It was released on November 30, 2011 in three editions: two CD+DVD editions and a regular edition.

Composition 
The album includes eight original Japanese songs. It also includes Japanese versions from each lead single from their Korean EPs and albums. Most notably, "Heartbeat" from 1:59PM, "Without U" from Don't Stop Can't Stop, "I'll Be Back" from Still 2:00PM and "Hands Up" from the album with same name. It also has a song written by the member Jun. K.

Singles 
The album has three singles. The lead single of the album (and also their Japanese debut single) is "Take Off". It was released on May 18, 2011 and sold more than 75,000 copies at the date.

The second single is the song "I'm Your Man". It was released on August 17, 2011 and sold more than 85,000 copies at the date.

The third and last single from the album is "Ultra Lover". It was released on November 2, 2011 and has sold more than 100,000 copies at the date. This is the first single of the group to get certified Gold by RIAJ.

All singles peaked number 4 in Oricon's Weekly chart.

Promotions 
To promote the album, the band released a music video for the song "Hands Up". It premiered on the Japanese major music channels on November 21, 2011.

Track listings

Charts
Oricon

Other charts

Release history

References

2011 albums
2PM albums
Japanese-language albums
Ariola Records albums
Sony Music Entertainment Japan albums